The Gazi Atik Ali Pasha Mosque is a 15th-century Ottoman mosque located in the Çemberlitaş neighbourhood of the Fatih district in Istanbul, Turkey. Its construction was started under the orders of the future Grand Vizier Hadım Atik Ali Pasha in 1496 and was completed in 1497, during the reign of Sultan Bayezid II. The mosque is located near the entrance to the Kapalıçarşı (Grand Bazaar), the Column of Constantine, and the historical Nuruosmaniye Mosque.

See also
 Islamic architecture
 List of mosques
 Ottoman architecture

References 
 Atik Ali Pasha Mosque at ArchNet.org
 Atik Ali Pasha Mosque at Istanbul Metropolitan Municipality website

External links

 Images of Atik Ali Pasha Mosque
 Tens of pictures of the mosque

Religious buildings and structures completed in 1497
Ottoman mosques in Istanbul
15th-century mosques